Zizina otis, the lesser grass blue, is a species of blue (Lycaenidae) butterfly found in south and southeast Asia. The species was first described by Johan Christian Fabricius in 1787. The lesser grass blue is often misidentified as Zizina labradus, the common grass blue.

Description

Male upperside
Pale violet blue, with a silvery sheen in certain lights, forewing: a broad brown edging along the termen, which covers in some specimens quite the outer fourth of the wing, while in others is much narrower. It is always broadest at the apex and is bounded by an anteciliary darker line, beyond which the cilia are brownish at base and white outwardly.

Hindwing: anterior or costal third to half and apex brown; a slender black anteciliary line, beyond which the cilia are as in the forewing.

Male underside
Brownish grey. Forewing: a short, transverse, dusky lunule on the discocellulars and a transverse, anteriorly curved, discal series of seven minute black spots, all the spots more or less rounded, the posterior two geminate (paired), the discocellular lunule and each discal spot conspicuously encircled with white; the terminal markings beyond the above consist of an inner and an outer transverse subterminal series of dusky spots, each spot edged on the inner side very obscurely with dusky white, the inner line of spots lunular, the outer with the spots more or less rounded. Cilia dusky.

Hindwing: a transverse, curved, sub-basal series of four spots and an irregular transverse discal series of nine small spots black, each spot encircled narrowly with white. Of the discal spots the posterior four are placed in an outwardly oblique, slightly curved line, the middle two spots geminate; the three spots above these are placed in an oblique transverse line further outwards; lastly, the anterior two spots are posited one over the other and shifted well inwards, just above the apex of the cell; discocellular lunule and terminal markings as on the forewing, but the inner subterminal lunular line in the latter broader and more prominent. Cilia dusky. Antenna black, shafts ringed with white; head, thorax and abdomen brown, with a little blue scaling; beneath: white.

Female upperside
Brown, with a more or less distinct suffusion of violet blue at the bases of the wings, on the hindwing continued obscurely along the dorsum; both forewings and hindwings with slender anteciliary lines, darker than the ground colour.

Female underside
Ground colour slightly darker than in the male, markings precisely similar. Antennae, head, thorax and abdomen as in the male, but the thorax and abdomen above without any blue scaling.

Distribution
Zizina otis occurs in south Asia. It was reported from the Hawaiian island of Oahu in 2008.
While Zizina otis labradus is found in the North Island of New Zealand and the northern part of the South Island, Zizina otis oxleyi is found only in the southern part of the South Island.

Larval host plants
The species breeds on many plants of the family Leguminosae including Alysicarpus vaginalis, Desmodium species, Glycine max, Indigofera species, and Mimosa species.

Gallery

See also
List of butterflies of India (Lycaenidae)

References

General reading

External links

Polyommatini
Butterflies of Asia
Butterflies of Oceania
Butterflies of Indonesia
Butterflies of Malaysia
Butterflies of Singapore
Insects of Hawaii
Butterflies of New Zealand
Lepidoptera of the Philippines
Butterflies described in 1787